EQP may refer to:
Equational prover
Exact quantum polynomial time
Equality-constrained quadratic program
Equilibrium partitioning
Elders quorum president
England Qualified Player, individuals such as Ben Meehan who are qualified to play rugby union for England